Atta or ATTA may refer to:
 Atta Halilintar, Indonesian YouTuber, singer and entrepreneur 
 Atta (ant), a genus of ants in the family Formicidae
 Atta (novel), a 1953 novel by Francis Rufus Bellamy
 Atta flour, whole wheat flour made from durum wheat commonly used in South Asian cooking
 Atta (Buddhism), Pali for "self" or "soul", central to the core Buddhist concept of Anatta, no-self
 Atta, Jalandhar, a village in India
 ATTA, acronym of Akabar n Tagrawla d Tanemla Amazigh, or Berber Socialism and Revolution Party
 A group of Lumad peoples
 Princess Atta, a character from the Disney and Pixar film A Bug's Life
 Ata (name), people with the first name or family name, sometimes spelled Atta

See also
 Attar (disambiguation)